Naresh Kumar may refer to:

 Naresh Kumar HN, Indian film director and a screenwriter who works in Kannada cinema
 Naresh Kumar (tennis) (1928–2022), Indian tennis player
 Naresh Kumar Shad (1927–1969), Urdu Ghazal and writer of Qat'aa and Rubai
 Naresh Kumar (wrestler) (born 1965), Indian wrestler who competed at the 1988 Summer Olympics
 Nareish Kumar, Fiji Indian politician
 Naresh Kumar (CRPF officer), Indian police officer